Álvaro de Saavedra (d. 1529), fully Álvaro de Saavedra Cerón, was one of the Spanish explorers of the Pacific Ocean.

Life

Early life
The exact date and place of his birth are unknown, but he was born in the late 15th century or early 16th century in Spain. Hernán Cortés was his relative, whom he accompanied to Mexico (New Spain) in 1526.

1527 Expedition
In 1527, Hernán Cortés prepared a new expedition to search for the missing fleet of the Loaísa expedition and commissioned his cousin Álvaro to command the new expedition. However, the true purpose of the expedition was to find  new lands in the South Sea (Pacific Ocean) and to bring back spice plants.

On October 31, 1527, they sailed from Zihuatanejo, Guerrero. On 15 December, after having sailed 1170 leagues, the Espiritu Santo and the Santiago swept on ahead, after a sudden squall,  never to be heard of again. On 29 December the La Florida sighted the Utirik-Toke atoll complexes, and on 1 January 1528 the Rongelap-Ailinginae atolls, both in the Marshall Islands, which were jointly charted as "Islas de los Reyes" (Islands of the Kings, referring to the Three Wise Kings due to the proximity to the festivity of Epiphany). On 2 February 1528 the "La Florida" sighted the Philippines and the following day anchored at a small island off the north coast of Mindanao, after 95 days since its departure and having sailed 1923 leagues. This makes Saavedra the first navigator to cross the Pacific Ocean from the Americas.

On 30 March 1528 the "La Florida" arrived to Tidore, the Spanish stronghold in the Moluccas where the men remaining from the Loaisa expedition were found, and they joined them to fight the Portuguese in the neighbouring Ternate.

To carry out the instructions of the expedition and bring further assistance to the Spaniards in Tidore, Saavedra set sail for New Spain on the 14 June 1528. On 24 June 1528, the "La Florida" discovered the Schouten Islands and landed on Yapen. These were charted respectively as "Islas de Oro" (Golden Islands) and "Payne" island. They continued coasting western New Guinea and on 15 August discovered the Admiralty Islands landing on Manus that they charted as "Urays La Grande" (Urays the Big). They then sailed north  and discovered  the Nomoi Islands in the Carolines. Then they were diverted by the northeast trade winds that threw them back to the Moluccas, returning to Tidore on 19 November 1528.

On 3 May 1529, Álvaro de Saavedra tried again the second time by navigating back down south. Again he toured the western part of New Guinea getting to Manus, then heading north and discovering on 14 September Pohnpei and Ant in the Carolines. On 21 September they discovered Ujelang Atoll, in the Marshalls that they charted as "Los Pintados" (The Painted Ones) because of its inhabitants being tattooed. On 1 October they discovered Enewetak Atoll, that they named "Los Jardines" (The Gardens) because of their beauty and the friendliness of their inhabitants. Soon after Saavedra died, and Pedro Laso took command. They sailed north up to the 31N but not finding westerly winds and also after the death of Pedro Laso, they finally decided to turn around the ship and again return to the Moluccas, arriving to Halmahera next to Tidore on 8 December 1529. They were captured there by the Portuguese and held in captivity for five years. In 1534, the surviving eight members of his crew made it back to Spain.

Hawaii 
There are some questions as to whether Spanish explorers did arrive in the Hawaiian Islands two centuries before Captain James Cook's first recorded visit in 1778. For two and a half centuries Spanish galleons crossed the Pacific along a route that passed south of Hawaiʻi on their way to Manila. The exact route was kept secret to protect the Spanish trade monopoly against competing powers.

In the case of the Saavedra expedition, the sighting of Hawaii could have happened when on 28 November 1527, land was sighted to the north, approximately in the longitude of Hawaii but not found again after a two-days search. Also, the later disappeared Santiago and Espiritu Santo could have arrived in Hawaii.

There is an old Hawaiian oral story that describes white people arriving in the islands many generations ago, who were welcomed by Chief Wakalana. It is possible that these visitors were crew members from Alvaro de Saavedra's expedition.

References

External links
 Filipiniana.net - The Premier Digital Library of the Internet: Voyage of Alvaro de Saavedra 1527-28
 ixtapa-zihuatanejo.com Alvaro Saavedra y Ceron in Zihuatanejo, Mexico. Our history. Official website of Zihuatanejo Hotels

Year of birth unknown
1529 deaths
16th-century Spanish people
16th-century explorers
C
Colonial Mexico
Spanish conquistadors
Spanish explorers of the Pacific